Boudouaou is a town and commune in Algeria.

It may also refer to:

Places
 Boudouaou-El-Bahri, a commune in Algeria.
 Boudouaou District, a district in Algeria.

History
 First Battle of Boudouaou (1837), a battle during the French conquest of Algeria.
 Second Battle of Boudouaou (1871), a battle during the Mokrani Revolt of Algeria.
 2006 Boudouaou bombing, a terrorist attack in Algeria.
 2011 Boudouaou rail accident, a rail accident in Algeria.